"A Fix with Sontarans" is a specially written Doctor Who segment produced for the BBC children's programme, Jim'll Fix It featuring Colin Baker in character as the Sixth Doctor. It was broadcast on 23 February 1985.

Plot
The Sixth Doctor (Colin Baker) is working the controls in the TARDIS, and he accidentally teleports his former companion Tegan Jovanka (Janet Fielding) on board. She is less than happy about this, and reluctantly agrees to help the Time Lord. He reveals that two Sontarans are on board, and they possess a powerful vitrox bomb with which they intend to blow up the time machine.

The Doctor then accidentally beams on board an Earthling called Gareth Jenkins, who happens to be dressed in an outfit similar to his own. Gareth agrees to help in any way he can, and helps The Doctor set a trap for the Sontarans. The two aliens break into the console room, destroying one of the TARDIS's doors in the process, much to the Doctor's indignation. The leader introduces himself as Group Marshall Nathan and demands that the Doctor introduces his group. Upon hearing Gareth's name, Nathan reveals that in 2001 their invasion of Earth would be foiled by a brave rebel called Gareth Jenkins; and if they kill him now their future success is assured. However, Gareth springs their trap and kills the two villains. Jimmy Savile then appears and presents Gareth with his Jim'll Fix It medal, as well as the prop "Mezon gun" the Sontarans used.

Production
In the Built for War DVD Extra found in "The Sontaran Experiment", Colin Baker said, "Jimmy Savile is much more frightening than the Sontarans."
During the fallout of the Jimmy Savile sexual abuse scandal, Baker expressed how he felt very uncomfortable with Savile during the filming of this scene. In an article for Bucks Free Press on 9 November 2012, Baker wrote:

I met Jimmy Savile briefly in the 1980s when I was working on Doctor Who. A young man had written asking if he could “fix it” for him to meet the Doctor and travel in the Tardis. After the lad had saved the day and the Sontarans had been “fixed”, Savile entered the set and did his usual self-congratulatory shtick.  I didn’t warm to him. His demeanour was neither friendly, nor inclusive. He behaved much as one might expect a child to behave who had been indulged and led to believe that life revolved around them. There was certainly none of the professional respect that one would expect to be shared when two programmes combine for a special purpose. Even though we were on the Tardis set, it was very much his territory and his agenda.

Cast notes
Janet Fielding was asked to participate in the sketch when Nicola Bryant proved unavailable to reprise her role as the Doctor's then-current assistant Peri Brown. In a 2022 interview on the Season 22 Blu Ray Boxset, Bryant stated that she was not allowed to take part after refusing a part in John Nathan-Turners pantomime.

The young Gareth Jenkins in this broadcast is not the same Gareth Jenkins who currently works as a composer, audio engineer, and actor for Doctor Who audio play producers Big Finish, but is in fact the current Head of Campaigns for children's charity Save the Children.

Broadcast and releases
"A Fix with Sontarans" was broadcast during the run of The Two Doctors (on the same day as Part 2) and is featured as an extra on the DVD release of that story. Later pressings of the Region 2 DVD have removed the segment due to the Jimmy Savile sexual abuse scandal. On January 20th, 2022, it was announced that "A Fix With Sontarans" would be included as an extra on the Season 22 Blu-ray eventually released in June 2022. 

The version of A Fix with Sontarans on the Blu-ray collection has been edited: instead of Jimmy Savile appearing on the TARDIS scanner at the end of the story, a shot is inserted of a CGI Sontaran battle fleet, with new dialogue from Colin Baker saying that "this is just the beginning". The clip then goes straight into the credits, with Savile's cameo appearance deleted entirely. The Blu-ray release includes a commentary track with Colin Baker, Janet Fielding, and a now-adult Gareth Jenkins, where they discuss the production with moderator Toby Hadoke. The original footage of Savile has also been edited out of The Colin Baker years, a 1994 documentary (originally released unedited on VHS), which is also included in the Blu-ray collection.

References

Doctor Who crossovers
Doctor Who spin-offs
Sixth Doctor stories
1985 British television episodes
Doctor Who mini-episodes
Jimmy Savile